The St. Thomas (Minnesota) Tommies men's ice hockey team represents the University of St. Thomas (Minnesota) in NCAA Division I ice hockey.

History
St. Thomas is one of the oldest ice hockey programs in the nation, predating even Minnesota, having played their first varsity game in the 1920–21 season. That year St. Thomas, along with six other small Minnesota colleges, formed the Minnesota Intercollegiate Athletic Conference and began playing one another in many sports. Over the course of the first sixty five years, St. Thomas was one of the better teams in the conference but it became the leading program once Terry Skrypek arrived in 1987. In his 23 years with the program, Skrypek won 13 conference championships, 9 conference tournament titles and reached the NCAA Division III championship game twice.

In 2019 the MIAC took the unprecedented step of removing St. Thomas from its membership because of concerns about “athletic competitive parity.” Because the removal affected all sports and was effective at the end of the 2020–21 season, St. Thomas had time to decide what it would do next. The men's ice hockey program was given the green light to jump directly to the Division I level in July 2020. Before the end of the month, the seven teams who had previously announced their intention to restart the CCHA with the 2021–22 season voted unanimously to accept the Tommies as the eighth member of the conference.

In 2023, St. Thomas announced plans for the new Lee and Penny Anderson Arena, with the team planned to begin playing its home games there in the fall of 2025.

Season-by-season results

Source:

Head coaches
As of completion of the 2022–23 season

Current roster
As of July 21, 2022.

References

External links
Official Home Page

 
Ice hockey teams in Minnesota
University of St. Thomas (Minnesota)